Chhota Koranja is a small village in Jashpur district of Chhattisgarh state of India.

See also 
 Jashpur district

References 

Villages in Jashpur district